Enterobacter cloacae is a clinically significant Gram-negative, facultatively-anaerobic, rod-shaped bacterium.

Microbiology
In microbiology labs, E. cloacae is frequently grown at 30 °C on nutrient agar or at 35 °C in tryptic soy broth. It is a rod-shaped, Gram-negative bacterium, is facultatively anaerobic, and bears peritrichous flagella. It is oxidase-negative and catalase-positive.

Industrial use
Enterobacter cloacae has been used in a bioreactor-based method for the biodegradation of explosives and in the biological control of plant diseases. Enterobacter cloacae strain MBB8 isolated from the Gulf of Mannar, India was reported to degrade poly vinyl alcohol (PVA). This was the first report of a PVA degrader from the Enterobacter genus.  E. cloacae was also reported to produce exopolysaccharide (EPS) as high as 18.3g/L.  GC-MS analysis of E. cloacae EPS showed the presence of glucose and mannose in the molar ratio of 1: 1.5e−2.

Safety
Enterobacter cloacae is considered a biosafety level 1 organism in the United States and level 2 in Canada.

Genomics
A draft genome sequence of Enterobacter cloacae subsp. cloacae was announced in 2012. The bacteria used in the study were isolated from giant panda feces.

Clinical significance
Enterobacter cloacae is a member of the normal gut flora of many humans and is not usually a primary pathogen. Some strains have been associated with urinary tract and respiratory tract infections in immunocompromised individuals. Treatment with cefepime and gentamicin has been reported.

A 2012 study in which Enterobacter cloacae transplanted into previously germ-free mice resulted in increased obesity when compared with germ-free mice fed an identical diet, suggesting a link between obesity and the presence of Enterobacter gut flora.

Species of the Enterobacter cloacae complex
Enterobacter cloacae was described for the first time in 1890 by Jordan[201] as Bacillus cloacae, and then underwent numerous taxonomical changes, becoming 'Bacterium cloacae' in 1896 (Lehmann and Neumann), Cloaca cloacae in 1919 (Castellani and Chalmers), it was identified as 'Aerobacter cloacae' in 1923 (Bergey et al.), Aerobacter cloacae in 1958 (Hormaeche and Edwards) and E. cloacae in 1960 (Hormaeche and Edwards), by which it is still known today.[7] E. cloacae is ubiquitous in terrestrial and aquatic environments (water, sewage, soil and food). These strains occur as commensal microflora in the intestinal tracts of humans and animals[1] and play an important role as pathogens in plants and insects. This diversity of habitats is mirrored by the genetic variety of the nomenspecies E. cloacae.[6] E. cloacae is also an important nosocomial pathogen responsible for bacteremia and lower respiratory tract, urinary tract and intra-abdominal infections, as well as endocarditis, septic arthritis, osteomyelitis and skin and soft tissue infections. The skin and the GI tract are the most common sites through which E. cloacae can be contracted.[1,29]

Enterobacter cloacae tends to contaminate various medical, intravenous and other hospital devices. Nosocomial outbreaks have also been associated with colonization of certain surgical equipment and operative cleaning solutions. Another potential reservoir for nosocomial bacteremia is the heparin solution used to irrigate certain intravascular devices continually. This fluid had been implicated as a reservoir for outbreaks of device-associated bacteremia in several instances.[30]

In recent years, E. cloacae has emerged as one of the most commonly found nosocomial pathogen in neonatal units, with several outbreaks of infection being reported.[31] In 1998, van Nierop et al. reported an outbreak in a neonatal intensive care unit with nine deaths,[32] and in 2003, Kuboyama et al. reported three outbreaks with 42 systemic infections and a mortality of 34%.[33] This microorganism may be transmitted to neonates through contaminated intravenous fluids, total parenteral nutrition solutions and medical equipment. Many single-clone outbreaks, probably caused by cross-transmission via healthcare workers, have been described, suggesting that inpatients can also act as a reservoir.[31] The type strains of the species are E. cloacae ATCC 49162 and 13047. This latter strain is the first complete genome sequence of the E. cloacae species and the type strain is E. cloacae subsp. cloacae.

The complete E. cloacae subsp. cloacae ATCC 13047 genome contains a single circular chromosome of 5,314,588 bp and two circular plasmids, pECL_A and pECL_B, of 200,370 and 85,650 bp (GenBank accession numbers CP001918, CP001919 and CP001920, respectively).[34]

The other genomes of E. cloacae that have been sequenced are deposited in GenBank under accession numbers CP002272, CP002886, FP929040 and AGSY00000000.

Enterobacter asburiae is named after Mary Alyce Fife-Asbury, an American bacteriologist who made many important contributions to the classification of Enterobacteriaceae, particularly in describing new Klebsiella and Salmonella serotypes,[35–37] new genera and new species.[38–42] E. asburiae sp. nov. was described in 1986 based on the enteric group 17.[43] This group was defined in 1978 as a group of biochemically similar strains isolated from different human specimens[44] and sent to the CDC. Before the designation of 'enteric group 17', these strains had been reported as unidentified or atypical Citrobacter or Enterobacter strains.[44] After several studies, it was shown that these strains represent a single new species in the genus Enterobacter, which was named E. asburiae.

Enterobacter asburiae strains have been isolated from the soil and implicated in the mobilization of phosphate for plant nutrition from calcium phosphate, but most E. asburiae species have been isolated from human sources. The type strain of the species E. asburiae is ATCC 35953 and was isolated from lochia exudates of a 22-year-old woman in the USA.[43] The only sequenced strain of E. asburiae is LF7a, which contains a circular DNA (4,812,833 bp) and two circular plasmids, pENTAS01 (166,725 bp) and pENTAS02 (32,574 bp), which were submitted by Lucas et al. in 2011 to the US DOE Joint Genome Institute (CA, USA; GenBank accession numbers CP003026.1, CP003027.1 and CP003028.1, respectively).

Enterobacter hormaechei  is named after Estenio Hormaeche, a Uruguayan microbiologist who (with PR Edwards) proposed and defined the genus Enterobacter.[7] The name E. hormaechei was formerly called enteric group 75, which contained 11 strains that were sent to the CDC for identification between 1973 and 1984. Twelve additional strains were received from 1985 to 1987, three of which were blood isolates. E. hormaechei was first described on the basis of 23 isolates sent to the CDC for identification. At that time, they could not be assigned to a species since they were negative in the D-sorbitol and melibiose tests and did not fit the biochemical profile of any established Enterobacter species. The species E. hormaechei was proposed to be lactose-, D-sorbitol-, raffinose-, melibiose- and esculin-negative and 87% dulcitol-positive. These species were originally defined by O'Hara et al. when a large hybridization group of enteric organisms was isolated and found to be associated with bloodstream infections.[10]

The type strain of E. hormaechei is ATCC 49162 and was isolated from the sputum of a man in California in 1977.[10] The whole-genome shotgun sequencing project was submitted in 2011 to the Human Genome Sequencing Center (TX, USA; GenBank accession number AFHR00000000).

Enterobacter hormaechei consists of three different subspecies: E. hormaechei subsp. oharae, E. hormaechei subsp. hormaechei and E. hormaechei subsp. steigerwaltii, which corresponds to genetic clusters VI, VII and VIII, respectively.[8] The differentiation of these subspecies is based on their particular properties and biochemical tests.[11]

Enterobacter hormaechei is commonly isolated as a nosocomial pathogen of clinical significance;[45,46] it has been reported in several outbreaks of sepsis in neonatal intensive care units in the USA[47] and in Brazil, where the outbreak originated from contaminated parenteral nutrition.[48]

Enterobacter kobei is named after Kobe City (Japan), where the type strain of this species was isolated. E. kobei was first described by Kosako et al. based on a collection of 23 strains with the general traits of E. cloacae and the common phenotypic difference of being Voges–Proskauer-negative.[49] The name E. kobei is proposed for a group of organisms referred to as NIH group 21 at the NIH, Tokyo. It was later found that NIH group 21 also resembled the CDC enteric group 69,[50] and E. kobei was compared with the latter. On the basis of DNA relatedness, both organisms could be included in a single taxon. However, the CDC enteric group 69 was described as positive in Voges–Proskauer and yellow pigmentation,[50] whereas all strains of E. kobei were Voges–Proskauer- and pigmentation-negative. These findings suggest that the relationship of both organisms is at the subspecies or biogroup level. The type strain of E. kobei is NIH 1485–1479 and was isolated by blood culture of a diabetic patient.

Enterobacte ludwigii,  named after Wolfgang Ludwig, a microbiologist working in bacterial systematics[51] and who developed the ARB databases as well as making them public.[52] This description is based on the phylogenetic analyses of partial hsp60 sequence data collected in a population genetic study,[6] as well as on DNA–DNA hybridization assays and phenotypic characterizations.

The type strain EN-119T was isolated from midstream urine of an 18-year-old male patient with a nosocomial urinary tract infection while he was hospitalized at the Grosshadern University-Hospital Munich, Germany. The GenBank accession number of the 16S rDNA of strain EN-119T is AJ853891.[12]

Enterobacter nimipressuralis The species E. nimipressuralis was originally defined by Brenner et al. and was formerly called Erwinia nimipressuralis, which was isolated from nonclinical sources (e.g., elm trees with a disease called wet wood).[43] Erwinia nimipressuralis was inserted in the Approved Lists of Bacterial Names in 1980. This microorganism is biochemically similar to E. cloacae, but it is different for acid production from sucrose and raffinose, whereas E. cloacae is positive in these tests. The type strain of E. nimipressuralis is ATCC 9912 and isolated from the elm Ulmus spp. in the USA (GenBank accession number AJ567900).

''Enterobacter cloacae subsp.cloacae strain PR-4 was isolated and identified by 16S rDNA gene sequence with phylogenetic tree view from explosive laden soil by P Ravikumar (GenBank accession number KP261383).

E. cloacae SG208 identified as a predominant microorganism in mixed culture isolated from petrochemical sludge, IOCL, Guwahati is responsible for degradation of benzene was reported by Padhi and Gokhale (2016)[137].

See also
Biohydrogen

References

 Sanders WE Jr, Sanders CC. Enterobacter spp.: pathogens poised to flourish at the turn of the century. Clinical Microbiology Reviews. 10, 220–241 (1997). Exhaustive review on the Enterobacter genus that highlights microbiological, clinical and epidemiological features and antibiotic susceptibility.
 Streit JM, Jones RN, Sader HS, Fritsche TR. Assessment of pathogen occurrences and resistance profiles among infected patients in the intensive care unit: report from the SENTRY Antimicrobial Surveillance Program (North America, 2001). International Journal of Antimicrobial Agents. 24, 111–118 (2004).
 Hidron AI, Edwards JR, Patel J et al.; for the National Healthcare Safety Network Team and Participating National Healthcare Safety Network Facilities. Antimicrobial-resistant pathogens associated with healthcare-associated infections: annual summary of data reported to the National Healthcare Safety Network at the Centers for Disease Control and Prevention, 2006–2007. Infection Control and Hospital Epidemiology. 29 (11), 996–1011 (2008).
 Wisplinghoff H, Bischoff T, Tallent SM et al. Nosocomial bloodstream infections in us hospitals: analysis of 24,179 cases from a prospective nationwide surveillance study. Clinical Infectious Diseases. 39, 309–317 (2004).
 Paauw A, Caspers MP, Schuren FH et al. Genomic diversity within the Enterobacter cloacae complex. PLOS ONE. 3, e3018 (2008).  Utilization of four genetic approaches for discriminating within the Enterobacter cloacae complex.
 Hoffmann H, Roggenkamp A. Population genetics of the nomenspecies Enterobacter cloacae. Applied and Environmental Microbiology. 69, 5306–5318 (2003).  Genetic clustering highlighting taxonomic and epidemiological characteristics of the E. cloacae complex.
 Hormaeche E, Edwards PR. A proposed genus Enterobacter. International Bulletin of Bacteriological Nomenclature and Taxonomy. 10, 71–74 (1960).
 Morand PC, Billoet A, Rottman M et al. Specific distribution within the Enterobacter cloacae complex of strains isolated from infected orthopedic implants. Journal of Clinical Microbiology. 47(8), 2489–2495 (2009).
 Wang GF, Xie GL, Zhu B et al. Identification and characterization of the Enterobacter complex causing mulberry (Morus alba) wilt disease in China. European Journal of Plant Pathology. 126, 465–478 (2010).
 O'Hara CM, Steigerwalt AG, Hill BC, Farmer JJ III, Fanning GG, Brenner DJ. Enterobacter hormaechei, a new species of the family Enterobacteriaceae formerly known as enteric group 75. Journal of Clinical Microbiology. 27, 2046–2049 (1989).
 Hoffmann H, Stindl S, Ludwig W et al. Enterobacter hormaechei subsp. oharae subsp. nov., E. hormaechei subsp. hormaechei comb. nov., and E. hormaechei subsp. steigerwaltii subsp. nov., three new subspecies of clinical importance Journal of Clinical Microbiology. 43, 3297–3303 (2005).
 Hoffmann H, Stindl S, Stumpf A et al. Description of Enterobacter ludwigii sp. nov., a novel Enterobacter species of clinical relevance. Systematic and Applied Microbiology. 28 (3), 206–212 (2005).
 Hoffmann H, Stindl S, Ludwig W et al. Reassignment of Enterobacter dissolvens to Enterobacter cloacae as E. cloacae subspecies dissolvens comb. nov. and emended description of Enterobacter asburiae and Enterobacter kobei. Systematic and Applied Microbiology. 28 (3), 196–205 (2005).
 Mshana SE, Gerwing L, Minde M et al. Outbreak of a novel Enterobacter sp. carrying bla CTX-M-15 in a neonatal unit of a tertiary care hospital in Tanzania. International Journal of Antimicrobial Agents. 38 (3), 265–269 (2011).
 Pavlovic M, Konrad R, Iwobi AN, Sing A, Busch U, Huber I. A dual approach employing MALDI-TOF MS and real-time PCR for fast species identification within the Enterobacter cloacae complex. FEMS Microbiology Letteres. 328, 46–53 (2012).
 Hoffmann H, Schmoldt S, Trqlzsch K et al. Nosocomial urosepsis caused by Enterobacter kobei with aberrant phenotype. Diagnostic Microbiology and Infectious Diseases. 53, 143–147 (2005).
 Townsend SM, Hurrell E, Caubilla-Barron J, Loc-Carrillo C, Forsythe SJ. Characterization of an extended-spectrum betalactamase Enterobacter hormaechei nosocomial outbreak, and other Enterobacter hormaechei misidentified as Cronobacter (Enterobacter) sakazakii. Microbiology. 154, 3659–3667 (2008).
 Garaizar J, Kaufmann ME, Pitt TL. Comparison of ribotyping with conventional methods for the type identification of Enterobacter cloacae. Journal of Clinical Microbiology. 29, 1303–1307 (1991).
 Haertl R, Bandlow G. Epidemiological fingerprinting of Enterobacter cloacae by small-fragment restriction endonuclease analysis and pulsed-field gel electrophoresis of genomic restriction fragments. Journal of Clinical Microbiology. 31, 128–133 (1993).
 Williams JGK, Kubelick AR, Livak KJ, Rafalski JA, Tingey SV. DNA polymorphisms amplified by arbitrary primers are useful genetic markers. Nucleic Acids Research. 18, 6531–6535 (1990).
 Stumpf AN, Roggenkamp A, Hoffmann H. Specificity of enterobacterial repetitive intergenic consensus and repetitive extragenic palindromic polymerase chain reaction for the detection of clonality within the Enterobacter cloacae complex. Diagnostic Microbiology and Infectious Diseases. 53 (1), 9–16 (2005).
 Barnes AI, Ortiz C, Paraje MG, Balanzino LE, Albesa I. Purification and characterization of a cytotoxin from Enterobacter cloacae. Canadian Journal of Microbiology. 43 (8), 729–733 (1997).
 Stuber K, Frey J, Burnens AP, Kuhnert P. Detection of type III secretion genes as a general indicator of bacterial virulence. Molecular and Cellular Probes. 17, 25–32 (2003).
 Krzyminska S, Mokracka J, Koczura R, Kaznowski A. Cytotoxic activity of Enterobacter cloacae human isolates. FEMS Immunology and Medical Microbiology. 56, 248–252 (2009).
 Krzyminska S, Koczura R, Mokracka J, Puton T, Kaznowski A. Isolates of the Enterobacter cloacae complex induce apoptosis of human intestinal epithelial cells. Microbial Pathogenesis. 49, 83–89 (2010).
 Olsén A, Arnqvist A, Hammar M, Normark S. Environmental regulation of curli production in Escherichia coli. Infectious Agents and Disease. 2 (4), 272–274 (1993).
 Zogaj X, Bokranz W, Nimtz M, Romling U. Production of cellulose and curli fimbriae by members of the family Enterobacteriaceae isolated from the human gastrointestinal tract. Infection and Immunity. 71 (7), 4151–4158 (2003).
 Kim SM, Lee HW, Choi YW et al. Involvement of curli fimbriae in the biofilm formation of Enterobacter cloacae. Journal of Microbiology. 50 (1), 175–178 (2012).
 Lee SO, Kim YS, Kim BN, Kim MN, Woo JH, Ryu J. Impact of previous use of antibiotics on development of resistance to extended-spectrum cephalosporins in patients with enterobacter bacteremia. European Journal of Clinical Microbiolog and Infectious Diseases. 8, 577–581 (2002).
 Musil I, Jensen V, Schilling J, Ashdown B, Kent T. Enterobacter cloacae infection of an expanded polytetrafluoroethylene femoral–popliteal bypass graft: a case report. Journal of Medical Case Reports. 9 (4), 131 (2010).
 Dalben M, Varkulja G, Basso M et al. Investigation of an outbreak of Enterobacter cloacae in a neonatal unit and review of the literature. Journal of Hospital Infection. 70, 7–14 (2008).
 van Nierop WH, Duse AG, Stewart RG, Bilgeri YR, Koornhof HJ. Molecular epidemiology of an outbreak of Enterobacter cloacae in the neonatal intensive care unit of a provincial hospital in Gauteng, South Africa. Journal of Clinical Microbiology.36, 3085–3087 (1998).
 Kuboyama RH, de Oliveira HB, Moretti-Branchini ML. Molecular epidemiology of systemic infection caused by Enterobacter cloacae in a high-risk neonatal intensive care unit. Infection Control and Hospital Epidemiology. 24, 490–494 (2003).
 Ren Y, Ren Y, Zhou Z et al. Complete genome sequence of Enterobacter cloacae subsp. cloacae type strain ATCC 13047. Journal of Bacteriology. 192 (9), 2463–2464 (2010).
 Edwards PR, Fife MA. Capsular types of Klebsiella. Journal of Infectious Diseases. 91, 92–104 (1952).
 Edwards PR, Fife MS. Eleven undescribed Arizona serotypes isolated from man. Antonie van Leeuwenhoek. 28, 402–404 (1962).
 Fife MA, McWhorter AC, Edwards PR. Ten new Arizona serotypes isolated from animals and animal food products. Antonie van Leeuwenhoek. 28, 369–372 (1962).
 Manzano D, Rojo P, Zubero Z, Alvarez M, Santamaria JM, Cisterna R. [Polymicrobial bacteremia caused by Enterobacter gergoviae and Candida albicans.] Enfermedades Infecciosas y Microbiología Clínica. 9, 186–187 (1991).
 Farmer JJ 3rd, Fanning GR, Davis BR et al. Escherichia fergusonii and Enterobacter taylorae, two new species of Enterobacteriaceae isolated from clinical specimens. Journal of Clinical Microbiology. 21 (1), 77–81 (1985).
 Ewing WH, Fife MA. Enterobacter agglomerans (Beijerinck) comb. nov. (the Herbicola–Lathyri bacteria). International Journal of Systematic Bacteriology. 22, 4–11 (1972).
 Farmer JJ III, Asbury MA, Hickman FW, Brenner DJ; Enterobacteriaceae Study Group. Enterobacter sakazakii: a new species of "Enterobacteriaceae" isolated from clinical specimens. International Journal of Systematic Bacteriology. 30, 569–584 (1980).
 Grimont PAD, Grimont F, Farmer JJ III, Asbury MA. Cedecea davisae gen. nov., sp. nov. and Cedecea lapagei sp. nov., new Enterobacteriaceae from clinical specimens. International Journal of Systematic Bacteriology. 31, 317–326 (1981).
 Brenner DJ, McWhorter AC, Kai A, Steigerwalt AG, Farmer JJ III. Enterobacter asburiae sp. nov., a new species found in clinical specimens, and reassignment of Erwinia dissolvens and Erwinia nimipressuralis to the genus Enterobacter as Enterobacter dissolvens comb. nov. and Enterobacter nimipressuralis comb. nov. Journal of Clinical Microbiology. 23, 1114–1120 (1986).
 Farmer JJ III, Davis BR, Hickman-Brenner FW et al. Biochemical identification of new species and biogroups of Enterobacteriaceae isolated from clinical specimens. Journal of Clinical Microbiology. 21, 46–76 (1985).
 Davin-Regli A, Bosi C, Charrel R et al. A nosocomial outbreak due to Enterobacter cloacae strains with the E. hormaechei genotype in patients treated with fluoroquinolones. Journal of Clinical Microbiology. 35, 1008–1010 (1997).
 Paauw A, Caspers MPM, Leverstein-van Hall MA et al. Identification of resistance and virulence factors in an epidemic Enterobacter hormaechei outbreak strain. Microbiology. 155, 1478–1488 (2009).
 Wenger PN, Tokars JI, Brennan P et al. An outbreak of Enterobacter hormaechei infection and colonization in an intensive care nursery. Clinical Infectious Diseases. 24 (6), 1243–1244 (1997).
 Campos LC, Lobianco LF, Seki LM, Santos RM, Asensi MD. Outbreak of Enterobacter hormaechei septicaemia in newborns caused by contaminated parenteral nutrition in Brazil. Journal of Hospital Infection. 66 (1), 95–97 (2007).
 Kosako Y, Tamura K, Sakazaki R, Miki K. Enterobacter kobei sp. nov., a new species of the family Enterobacteriaceae resembling Enterobacter cloacae. Current Microbiology. 33, 261–265 (1996).
 Farmer JJ. Enterobacteriaceae. In: Manual of Clinical Microbiology (6th Edition). Murray PR, Baron EJ, Pfaller MA, Tenover FC, Yolken RH (Eds). American Society for Microbiology, Washington, DC, USA, 438–449 (1994).
 Ludwig W, Klenk HP. Overview: a phylogenetic backbone and taxonomic framework for procaryotic systematics, In: Bergey's Manual of Systematic Bacteriology (2nd Edition). Garrity G (Ed.). Springer, NY, USA, 49–65 (2001).
 Ludwig W, Strunk O, Westram R et al. ARB: a software environment for sequence data. Nucleic Acid Research. 32, 1363–1371 (2004).
 Stock I, Grüger T, Wiedemann B. Natural antibiotic susceptibility of strains of the Enterobacter cloacae complex. International Journal of Antimicrobial Agents. 18 (6), 537–545 (2001). Evaluation of a wide range of antibiotics tested against E. cloacae, Enterobacter hormaechei and Enterobacter asburiae strains, providing a database for their natural susceptibility.
 Kim DM, Jang SJ, Neupane GP et al. Enterobacter nimipressuralis as a cause of pseudobacteremia. BMC Infectious Diseases. 10, 315 (2010).
 Scotta C, Juan C, Cabot G et al. Environmental microbiota represents a natural reservoir for dissemination of clinically relevant metallo-beta-lactamases. Antimicrobial Agents and Chemotherapy. 55, 5376–5379 (2011).
 George AJ. AmpC β-lactamases. Clinical Microbiology Reviews. 22 (1), 161–182 (2009).
 Roh KH, Song W, Chung HS et al. Chromosomal cephalosporinase in Enterobacter hormaechei as an ancestor of ACT-1 plasmid-mediated AmpC beta-lactamase. Journal of Medical Microbiology. 61 (1), 94–100 (2012).
 Choi SH, Lee JE, Park SJ et al. Prevalence, microbiology, and clinical characteristics of extended-spectrum beta-lactamase-producing Enterobacter spp., Serratia marcescens, Citrobacter freundii, and Morganella morganii in Korea. European Journal of Clinical Microbiology and Infectious Diseases. 26, 557–561 (2007).
 Smith Moland E, Sanders CC, Thomson KC. Can results obtained with commercially available MicroScan microdilution panels serve as an indicator of beta-lactamase production among Escherichia coli and Klebsiella isolates with hidden resistance to expanded-spectrum cephalosporins and aztreonam? Journal of Clinical Microbiology. 36, 2575–2579 (1998).
 Tzelepi E, Giakkoupi P, Sofianou D, Loukova V, Kemeroglou A, Tsakris A. Detection of extended-spectrum beta-lactamases in clinical isolates of Enterobacter cloacae and Enterobacter aerogenes. Journal of Clinical Microbiology. 38 (2), 542–546 (2000).
 Tzouvelekis LS, Vatopoulos AC, Katsanis G, Tzelepi E. Rare case of failure by an automated system to detect extended-spectrum beta-lactamase in a cephalosporin-resistant Klebsiella pneumoniae isolate. Journal of Clinical Microbiology. 37 (7), 2388 (1999).
 Girlich D, Poirel L, Leelaporn A et al. Molecular epidemiology of the integronlocated VEB-1 extended-spectrum beta-lactamase in nosocomial enterobacterial isolates in Bangkok, Thailand. Journal of Clinical Microbiology. 39, 175–182 (2001).
 Paterson DL. Resistance in Gram-negative bacteria: Enterobacteriaceae. American Journal of Medicine. 119 (6 Suppl. 1), S20–S28 (2006).
 Paterson DL, Bonomo RA. Extended-spectrum beta-lactamases: a clinical update. Clinical Microbiology Reviews. 18, 657–686 (2005).
 Jiang X, Ni Y, Jiang Y et al. Outbreak of infection caused by Enterobacter cloacae producing the novel VEB-3 beta-lactamase in China. Journal of Clinical Microbiology. 43 (2), 826–831 (2005).
 Ho PL, Shek RH, Chow KH et al. Detection and characterization of extended-spectrum beta-lactamases among bloodstream isolates of Enterobacter spp. in Hong Kong, 2000–2002. Journal of Antimicrobial Chemotherapy. 55 (3), 326–332 (2005).
 Pitout JD, Laupland KB. Extended-spectrum beta-lactamase-producing Enterobacteriaceae: an emerging public-health concern. Lancet Infectious Diseases. 8, 159–166 (2008).
 Poirel L, Pitout JD, Nordmann P. Carbapenemases: molecular diversity and clinical consequences. Future Microbiology. 2 (5), 501–512 (2007).
 Panagea T, Galani I, Souli M, Adamou P, Antoniadou A, Giamarellou H. Evaluation of CHROMagar™ KPC for the detection of carbapenemase-producing Enterobacteriaceae in rectal surveillance cultures. International Journal of Antimicrobial Agents. 37 (2), 124–128 (2011).
 Cohen Stuart J, Leverstein-Van Hall MA; Dutch Working Party on the Detection of Highly Resistant Microorganisms. Guideline for phenotypic screening and confirmation of carbapenemases in Enterobacteriaceae. International Journal of Antimicrobial Agents. 36 (3), 205–210 (2010).
 Lo A, Verrall R, Williams J, Stratton C, Della-Latta P, Tang YW. Carbapenem resistance via the bla KPC-2 gene in Enterobacter cloacae blood culture isolate. Southern Medical Journal. 103 (5), 453–454 (2010).
 Bush K, Jacoby GA. Updated functional classification of beta-lactamases. Antimicrobial Agents and Chemotherapy. 54, 969–976 (2010).
 Nordmann P, Naas T, Poirel L. Global spread of carbapenemase producing Enterobacteriaceae. Emerging Infectious Diseases. 17, 1791–1798 (2011).
 Naas T, Nordmann P. Analysis of a carbapenem-hydrolyzing class A beta-lactamase from Enterobacter cloacae and of its LysR-type regulatory protein. Proceedings of the National Academy of Sciences – USA. 91, 7693–7697 (1994).
 Radice M, Power P, Gutkind G et al. First class A carbapenemase isolated from Enterobacteriaceae in Argentina. Antimicrobial Agents and Chemotherapy. 48, 1068–1069 (2004).
 Pottumarthy S, Moland ES, Jeretschko S, Swanzy SR, Thomson KS, Fritsche TR. NmcA carbapenem-hydrolyzing enzyme in Enterobacter cloacae in North America. Emerging Infectious Diseases. 9, 999–1002 (2003).
 Naas T, Cattoen C, Bernusset S, Cuzon G, Nordmann P. First Identification of bla IMI-1 in an Enterobacter cloacae clinical isolate from France. Antimicrobial Agents and Chemotherapy. 56 (3), 1664–1665 (2012).
 Rasmussen BA, Bush K, Keeney D et al. Characterization of IMI-1 beta-lactamase, a class A carbapenem-hydrolyzing enzyme from Enterobacter cloacae. Antimicrobial Agents and Chemotherapy. 40, 2080–2086 (1996).
 Yun-Song Y, Xiao-Xing D, Zhi-Hui Z, Ya-Gang C, Lan-Juan L. First isolation of bla IMI-2 in an Enterobacter cloacae clinical isolate from China. Antimicrobial Agents and Chemotherapy. 50, 1610–1611 (2006).
 Nordmann P, Mariotte S, Naas T, Labia R, Nicolas MH. Biochemical properties of a carbapenem-hydrolyzing beta-lactamase from Enterobacter cloacae and cloning of the gene into Escherichia coli. Antimicrobial Agents and Chemotherapy. 37 (5), 939–946 (1993).
 Queenan AM, Bush K. Carbapenemases: the versatile beta-lactamases. Clinical Microbiology Reviews. 20, 440–458 (2007). Focuses on updated information on the epidemiological and biochemical characteristics of carbapenemases of E. cloacae.
 Aubron C, Poirel L, Ash RJ, Nordmann P. Carbapenemase-producing Enterobacteriaceae, U.S. rivers. Emerging Infectious Diseases. 11, 260–264 (2005).
 Giakkoupi P, Tzouvelekis LS, Tsakris A, Loukova V, Sofianou D, Tzelepi E. IBC-1, a novel integron-associated class A beta-lactamase with extended-spectrum properties produced by an clinical strain. Antimicrobial Agents and Chemotherapy. 44, 2247–2253 (2000).
 Bratu S, Landman D, Alam M, Tolentino E, Quale J. Detection of KPC carbapenem-hydrolyzing enzymes in Enterobacter spp. from Brooklyn, New York. Antimicrobial Agents and Chemotherapy. 49, 776–778 (2005).
 Cornaglia G, Giamarellou H, Rossolini GM. Metallo-beta-lactamases: a last frontier for beta-lactams? Lancet Infectious Diseases. 11 (5), 381–393 (2011).
 Deshpande LM, Jones RN, Fritsche TR, Sader HS. Occurrence and characterization of carbapenemase-producing Enterobacteriaceae: report from the SENTRY Antimicrobial Surveillance Program (2000–2004). Microbial Drug Resistance. 12 (4), 223–230 (2006).
 Yan JJ, Ko WC, Chuang CL, Wu JJ. Metallo-beta-lactamase-producing Enterobacteriaceae isolates in a university hospital in Taiwan: prevalence of IMP-8 in Enterobacter cloacae and first identification of VIM-2 in Citrobacter freundii. Journal of Antimicrobial Chemotherapy. 50, 503–511 (2002).
 Lee MF, Peng CF, Hsu HJ, Chen YH. Molecular characterisation of the metallo-beta-lactamase genes in imipenem-resistant Gram-negative bacteria from a university hospital in southern Taiwan. International Journal of Antimicrobial Agents. 32, 475–480 (2008).
 Luzzaro F, Docquier JD, Colinon C et al. Emergence in Klebsiella pneumoniae and Enterobacter cloacae clinical isolates of the VIM-4 metallo-beta-lactamase encoded by a conjugative plasmid. Antimicrobial Agents and Chemotherapy. 48, 648–650 (2004).
 Perilli MG, Mezzatesta ML, Marco F et al. Class I integron-borne bla VIM-1 carbapenemase in a strain of Enterobacter cloacae responsible for a case of fatal pneumonia. Microbial Drug Resistance. 14 (1), 45–47 (2008).
 Falcone M, Mezzatesta ML, Perilli MG et al. Infections with VIM-1 metallo-beta-lactamase-producing Enterobacter cloacae and their correlation with clinical outcome. Journal of Clinical Microbiology. 47 (11), 3514–3519 (2009).
 Panopoulou M, Alepopoulou E, Ikonomidis A, Grapsa A, Paspalidou E, Kartali-Ktenidou S. Emergence of VIM-12 in Enterobacter cloacae. Journal of Clinical Microbiology. 48 (9), 3414–3415 (2010).
 Souli M, Kontopidou FV, Papadomichelakis E, Galani I, Armaganidis A, Giamarellou H. Clinical experience of serious infections caused by Enterobacteriaceae producing VIM-1 metallo-beta-lactamase in a Greek university hospital. Clinical Infectious Diseases. 46, 847–854 (2008).
 Tato M, Coque TM, Ruiz-Garbajosa P et al. Complex clonal and plasmid epidemiology in the first outbreak of Enterobacteriaceae infection involving VIM-1 metallo-beta-lactamase in Spain: toward endemicity? Clinical Infectious Diseases. 45, 1171–1178 (2007).
 Yong D, Toleman MA, Giske CG et al. Characterization of a new metallo-beta-lactamase gene, bla NDM-1, and a novel erythromycin esterase gene carried on a unique genetic structure in Klebsiella pneumoniae sequence type 14 from India. Antimicrobial Agents and Chemotherapy. 53, 5046–5054 (2009).
 Brink AJ, Coetzee J, Clay CG et al. Emergence of New Delhi metallo-beta-lactamase (NDM-1) and Klebsiella pneumoniae carbapenemase (KPC-2) in South Africa. Journal of Clinical Microbiology. 50 2), 525–527 (2012).
 Bogaerts P, Bouchahrouf W, Rezende de Castro R et al. Emergence of NDM-1-producing Enterobacteriaceae in Belgium. Antimicrobial Agents and Chemotherapy. 55, 3036–3038 (2011).
 Carrer A, Poirel L, Yilmaz M et al. Spread of OXA-48-encoding plasmid in Turkey and beyond. Antimicrobial Agents and Chemotherapy. 54 (3), 1369–1373 (2010).
 Poirel L, Castanheira M, Carrër A et al. OXA-163, an OXA-48-related class D beta-lactamase with extended activity toward expanded-spectrum cephalosporins. Antimicrobial Agents and Chemotherapy. 55 (6), 2546–2551 (2011).
 Glupczynskia Y, Huanga TD, Bouchahroufa W et al. Rapid emergence and spread of OXA-48-producing carbapenem-resistant Enterobacteriaceae isolates in Belgian hospitals. International Journal of Antimicrobial Agents. 39, 168–172 (2012).
 Poirel L, Ros A, Carrër A et al. Cross-border transmission of OXA-48-producing Enterobacter cloacae from Morocco to France. Journal of Antimicrobial Chemotherapy. 66, 1181–1182 (2011).
 Szabó D, Silveira F, Hujer AM et al. Outer membrane protein changes and efflux pump expression together may confer resistance to ertapenem in Enterobacter cloacae. Antimicrobial Agents and Chemotherapy. 50 (8), 2833–2835 (2006).
 Chow JW, Fine MJ, Shlaes DM et al. Enterobacter bacteremia: clinical features and emergence of antibiotic resistance during therapy. Annals of Internal Medicine. 115, 585–590 (1991).
 Choi SH, Lee JE, Park SJ et al. Emergence of antibiotic resistance during therapy for infections caused by Enterobacteriaceae producing AmpC beta-lactamase implications for antibiotic use. Antimicrobial Agents and Chemotherapy. 52, 995–1000 (2008).
 Baucheron S, Imberechts H, Chaslus-Dancla E, Cloeckaert A. The AcrB multidrug transporter plays a major role in high-level fluoroquinolone resistance in Salmonella enterica serovar Typhimurium phage type DT204. Microbial Drug Resistance. 8, 281–289 (2002).
 Ruiz J. Mechanisms of resistance to quinolones: target alterations, decreased accumulation and DNA gyrase protection. Journal of Antimicrobial Chemotherapy. 51, 1109–1117 (2003).
 Perichon B, Courvalin P, Galimand M. Transferable resistance to aminoglycosides by methylation of G1405 in 16S rRNA and to hydrophilic fluoroquinolones by QepA-mediated efflux in Escherichia coli. Antimicrobial Agents and Chemotherapy. 51, 2464–2469 (2007).
 Cano ME, Rodríguez-Martínez JM, Aguero J et al. Detection of plasmid-mediated quinolone resistance genes in clinical isolates of Enterobacter spp. in Spain. Journal of Clinical Microbiology. 47 (7), 2033–2039 (2009).
 Robicsek A, Jacoby GA, Hooper DC. The worldwide emergence of plasmid-mediated quinolone resistance. Lancet Infectious Diseases. 6, 629–640 (2006).
 Martínez-Martínez L, Cano ME, Rodríguez-Martínez JM, Calvo J, Pascual A. Plasmid-mediated quinolone resistance. Expert Review of Anti-Infective Therapy. 6, 685–711 (2008).
 Park CH, Robicsek A, Jacoby GA, Sahm D, Hooper DC. Prevalence in the United States of aac(6')-Ib-cr encoding a ciprofloxacin modifying enzyme. Antimicrobial Agents and Chemotherapy. 50, 3953–3955 (2006).
 Jacoby GA, Chow N, Waites KB. Prevalence of plasmid mediated quinolone resistance. Antimicrobial Agents and Chemotherapy. 47, 559–562 (2003).
 Park YJ, Yu JK, Lee S, Oh EJ, Woo GJ. Prevalence and diversity of qnr alleles in AmpC-producing Enterobacter cloacae, Enterobacter aerogenes, Citrobacter freundii and Serratia marcescens: a multicentre study from Korea. Journal of Antimicrobial Chemotherapy. 60, 868–871 (2007).
 Nordmann P, Poirel L. Emergence of plasmid-mediated resistance to quinolones in Enterobacteriaceae. Journal of Antimicrobial Chemotherapy. 56, 463–469 (2005).
 Wu JJ, Ko WC, Tsai SH, Yan JJ. Prevalence of plasmid mediated quinolone resistance determinants QnrA, QnrB, and QnrS among clinical isolates of Enterobacter cloacae in a Taiwanese hospital. Antimicrobial Agents and Chemotherapy. 51, 1223–1227 (2007).
 Chmelnitsky I, Navon-Venezia S, Strahilevitz J, Carmeli Y. Plasmid-mediated qnrB2 and carbapenemase gene bla KPC-2 carried on the same plasmid in carbapenem-resistant ciprofloxacin-susceptible Enterobacter cloacae isolates. Antimicrobial Agents and Chemotherapy. 52 (8), 2962–2965 (2008).
 Jacoby G, Cattoir V, Hooper D et al. qnr gene nomenclature. Antimicrobial Agents and Chemotherapy. 52, 2297–2299 (2008).
 Neonakis I, Gikas A, Scoulica E, Manios A, Georgiladakis A, Tselentis Y. Evolution of aminoglycoside resistance phenotypes of four Gram-negative bacteria: an 8-year survey in a university hospital in Greece. International Journal of Antimicrobial Agents. 22, 526–531 (2003).
 Kim SY, Park YJ, Yu JK, Kim YS, Han K. Prevalence and characteristics of aac(6')-Ib-cr in AmpC-producing Enterobacter cloacae, Citrobacter freundii, and Serratia marcescens: a multicenter study from Korea. Diagnostic Microbiology and Infectious Diseases. 63, 314–318 (2009).
 Galani I, Souli M, Chryssouli Z, Orlandou K, Giamarellou H. Characterization of a new integron containing bla VIM-1 and aac(6')-IIc in an Enterobacter cloacae clinical isolate from Greece. Journal of Antimicrobial Chemotherapy. 55, 634–638 (2005).
 Xavier B, Dowzicky MJ. Antimicrobial susceptibility among Gram-negative isolates collected from intensive care units in North America, Europe, the Asia–Pacific rim, Latin America, the Middle East, and Africa between 2004 and 2009 as part of the Tigecycline Evaluation and Surveillance Trial. Clinical Therapeutics. 34 (1), 124–137 (2012).
 Anthony KB, Fishman NO, Linkin DR, Gasink LB, Edelstein PH, Lautenbach E. Clinical and microbiological outcomes of serious infections with multidrugresistant Gram-negative organisms treated with tigecycline. Clinical Infectious Diseases. 46, 567–570 (2008).
 Keeney D, Ruzin A, Bradford PA, RamA, a transcriptional regulator, and AcrAB, an RND-type efflux pump, are associated with decreased susceptibility to tigecycline in Enterobacter cloacae. Microbial Drug Resistance. 13 (1), 1–6 (2007).
 Daurel C, Fiant AL, Brémont S, Courvalin P, Leclercq R. Emergence of an Enterobacter hormaechei strain with reduced susceptibility to tigecycline under tigecycline therapy. Antimicrobial Agents and Chemotherapy. 53, 4953–4954 (2009).
 Falagas ME, Kasiakou SK. Colistin: the revival of polymyxins for the management of multidrug-resistant Gram-negative bacterial infections. Clinical Infectious Diseases. 40 (9), 1333–1341 (2006). Erratum in: Clinical Infectious Diseases. 42 (12), 1819 (2006).
 Price DJE, Graham DI. Effect of large doses of colistin sulphomethate on renal function. British Medical Journal. 4, 525–527 (1970).
 Koch-Weser J, Sidel VW, Federman EB, Kanarek P, Finer DC, Eaton AE. Adverse effects of sodium colistin methate: manifestations and specific reaction rates during 317 courses of therapy. Annals of Internal Medicine. 72, 857–868 (1970).
 Li J, Nation RL, Milne RW, Turnidge JD, Coulthard K. Evaluation of colistin as an agent against multi-resistant Gram negative bacteria. International Journal of Antimicrobial Agents. 25, 11–25 (2005).
 Plachouras D, Karvanen M, Friberg LE et al. Population pharmacokinetic analysis of colistin methanesulfonate and colistin after intravenous administration in critically ill patients with infections caused by Gram-negative bacteria. Antimicrobial Agents and Chemotherapy. 53 (8), 3430–3436 (2009).
 Groisman EA, Kayser J, Soncini FC. Regulation of polymyxin resistance and adaptation to low-Mg2+ environments. Journal of Bacteriology. 179 (22), 7040–7045 (1997).
 Lo-Ten-Foe JR, de Smet AM, Diederen BM, Kluytmans JA, van Keulen PH. Comparative evaluation of the Vitek 2, disk diffusion, etest, broth microdilution, and agar dilution susceptibility testing methods for colistin in clinical isolates, including heteroresistant Enterobacter cloacae and Acinetobacter baumannii strains. Antimicrobial Agents and Chemotherapy. 51 (10), 3726–3730 (2007).
 Tascini C, Urbani L, Biancofiore G et al. Colistin in combination with rifampin and imipenem for treating a bla VIM-1 metallo-beta-lactamase-producing Enterobacter cloacae disseminated infection in a liver transplant patient. Minerva Anestesiologica. 74 (1–2), 47–49 (2007).
 Centers for Disease Control and Prevention. Guidance for control of infections with carbapenem-resistant or carbapenemase producing Enterobacteriaceae in acute care facilities. Morbidity and Mortality Weekly Report. 58, 256–260 (2009).
 Lucet JC, Decre D, Fichelle A et al. Control of a prolonged outbreak of extended-spectrum beta-lactamase-producing Enterobacteriaceae in a university hospital. Clinical Infectious Diseases. 29, 1411–1418 (1999).
 Samra Z, Bahar J, Madar-Shapiro L, Aziz N, Israel S, Bishara J. Evaluation of CHROMagar KPC for rapid detection of carbapenem-resistant Enterobacteriaceae. Journal of Clinical Microbiology. 46, 3110–3111 (2008).
 Ravikumar P . GenBank New holotype for Enterobacter cloacae subsp. cloacae strain PR-4 isolated and identified by 16S rDNA gene sequence with Phylogenetic tree view, from explosive laden soil. International Journal of Research in Engineering and Applied Science. 6 (5) 53-65 (2016).
 Padhi, S.K., Gokhale, S., 2016. Benzene biodegradation by indigenous mixed microbial culture: Kinetic modeling and process optimization. International Biodeterioration & Biodegradation. https://dx.doi.org/10.1016/j.ibiod.2016.10.011

External links
Type strain of Enterobacter cloacae at BacDive -  the Bacterial Diversity Metadatabase

Enterobacteriaceae
Gram-negative bacteria
Bacteria described in 1890